Duff Lechaun Brumley (born August 25, 1970) is a retired Major League Baseball player who pitched a single season for the Texas Rangers. Brumley spent a further ten seasons in the minor league systems of the St. Louis Cardinals, Cincinnati Reds, Seattle Mariners and Philadelphia Phillies.

External links

Arkansas Travelers players
Chattanooga Lookouts players
Hamilton Redbirds players
Johnson City Cardinals players
Major League Baseball pitchers
Oklahoma City 89ers players
People from Cleveland, Tennessee
Port City Roosters players
Savannah Cardinals players
Cleveland State Cougars baseball players
Scranton/Wilkes-Barre Red Barons players
St. Petersburg Cardinals players
Texas Rangers players
1970 births
Living people
Baseball players from Tennessee